Jérôme Dreyfus (born 9 April 1971) is a French judoka.

Achievements

References
 

1971 births
Living people
French male judoka
Mediterranean Games gold medalists for France
Mediterranean Games medalists in judo
Competitors at the 1993 Mediterranean Games
Universiade medalists in judo
Universiade silver medalists for France
20th-century French people
21st-century French people